Trellix (formerly FireEye and McAfee Enterprise) is a privately held cybersecurity company founded in 2022. It has been involved in the detection and prevention of major cybersecurity attacks.
It provides hardware, software, and services to investigate cybersecurity attacks, protect against malicious software, and analyze IT security risks.

In March 2021, Symphony Technology Group (STG) announced its acquisition of McAfee Enterprise in an all-cash transaction for US$4.0 billion. STG completed the acquisition of McAfee’s Enterprise business in July 2021 with plans for re-branding. In June 2021, FireEye sold its name and products business to STG for $1.2bn. STG combined FireEye with its acquisition of McAfee's enterprise business to launch Trellix, an extended detection and response (XDR) company. Meanwhile, McAfee Enterprise's security service edge (SSE) business would operate as a separate company to be known as Skyhigh Security.

History

FireEye was founded in 2004 by Ashar Aziz, a former Sun Microsystems engineer. FireEye's first commercial product was not developed and sold until 2010. That same year, FireEye expanded into the Middle East. This was followed by the opening of new offices in the Asia Pacific in 2010, Europe in 2011 and Africa in 2013.

Initially, FireEye focused on developing virtual machines to download and test internet traffic before transferring it to a corporate or government network. The company diversified over time, in part through acquisitions.

In December 2012, founder Aziz stepped down as CEO and former McAfee CEO David DeWalt was appointed to the position. DeWalt was recruited to prepare the company for an initial public offering (IPO). The following year, FireEye raised an additional $50 million in venture capital, bringing its total funding to $85M. In late 2013, FireEye went public, raising $300M. FireEye remained public until 2021.

At the time, FireEye was growing rapidly. It had 175 employees in 2011, which grew to 900 by June 2013. Revenues multiplied eight-fold between 2010 and 2012. However, FireEye was not yet profitable, due to high operating costs such as research and development expenses.

In December 2013, FireEye acquired Mandiant for $1bn. Mandiant was a private company founded in 2004 by Kevin Mandia that provided incident response services in the event of a data security breach. Mandiant was known for investigating high-profile hacking groups. Before the acquisition, FireEye would often identify a security breach, then partner with Mandiant to investigate who the hackers were. Mandiant became a subsidiary of FireEye.  Since acquiring Mandiant, FireEye has been called in to investigate high-profile attacks against Target, JP Morgan Chase, Sony Pictures, Anthem, and others.

In late 2014, FireEye initiated a secondary offering, selling another $1.1bn in shares, to fund development of a wider range of products. Shortly afterward, FireEye acquired another data breach investigation company, nPulse, for approximately $60M. By 2015, FireEye was making more than $100M in annual revenue, but was still unprofitable, largely due to research and development spending.

In January 2016, FireEye acquired iSIGHT Partners for $275M. iSIGHT was a threat intelligence company that gathered information about hacker groups and other cybersecurity risks. This was followed by the acquisition of Invotas, an IT security automation company. DeWalt stepped down as CEO in 2016 and was replaced by Mandiant CEO and former FireEye President Kevin Mandia. Afterwards, there was downsizing and restructuring in response to lower-than-expected sales, resulting in a layoff of 300–400 employees. Profit and revenue increased on account of shifts to a subscription model and lower costs.

In March 2021, Symphony Technology Group (STG) acquired McAfee Enterprise for $4bn. In June 2021, FireEye announced the sale of its products business and name to STG for $1.2 bn. The sale split off its cyber forensics unit, Mandiant, and the FireEye stock symbol FEYE was relaunched as MNDT on the NASDAQ on 5 October 2021. On January 18, 2022, STG announced the launch of Trellix, an extended detection and response company, which is a combination of FireEye and the McAfee enterprise business. On 30 September 2021, STG announced Bryan Palma as CEO of the combined company.

Products and services
FireEye started as a "sandboxing" company. Sandboxing is where incoming network traffic is opened within a virtual machine to test it for malicious software, before being introduced into the network. FireEye's products diversified over time, in part through acquisitions. In 2017, FireEye transitioned from primarily selling appliances, to a software-as-a-service model.

FireEye sells technology products including network, email, and endpoint security, a platform for managing security operations centers called Helix, consulting services primarily based on incident response, and threat intelligence products.

The Central Management System (CMS) consolidates the management, reporting, and data sharing of Web MPS (Malware Protection System), Email MPS, File MPS, and Malware Analysis System (MAS) into a single network-based appliance by acting as a distribution hub for malware security intelligence.

The FireEye Cloud crowd-sources Dynamic Threat Intelligence (DTI) detected by individual FireEye MPS appliances and automatically distributes this time-sensitive zero-day intelligence globally to all subscribed customers in frequent updates. Content Updates include a combination of DTI and FireEye Labs generated intelligence identified through research efforts.

As of its inception in January 2022, Trellix has more than 40,000 customers, 5,000 employees, and $2bn in annual revenue. Trellix includes the endpoint, cloud, collaboration, data and user, application, and infrastructure security capabilities of FireEye and McAfee. The business focuses on threat detection and response using machine learning and automation, with security technology that can learn and adapt to combat advanced threats.

Operations
FireEye has been known for uncovering high-profile hacking groups.

2008–2014
In October/November 2009, FireEye participated to take down the Mega-D botnet (also known as Ozdok). On March 16, 2011, the Rustock botnet was taken down through action by Microsoft, US federal law enforcement agents, FireEye, and the University of Washington. In July 2012, FireEye was involved in the analysis of the Grum botnet's command and control servers located in the Netherlands, Panama, and Russia.

In 2013, Mandiant (before being acquired by FireEye) uncovered a multi-year espionage effort by a Chinese hacking group called APT1.

In 2014, the FireEye Labs team identified two new zero-day vulnerabilities –  – as part of limited, targeted attacks against major corporations. Both zero-days exploit the Windows kernel. Microsoft addressed the vulnerabilities in October 2014 Security Bulletin. Also in 2014, FireEye provided information on a threat group it calls FIN4. FIN4 appears to conduct intrusions that are focused on a single objective: obtaining access to insider information capable of making or breaking the stock prices of public companies. The group has targeted hundreds of companies and specifically targets the emails of C-level executives, legal counsel, regulatory, risk, and compliance personnel, and other individuals who would regularly discuss confidential, market-moving information. Also in 2014, FireEye released a report focused on a threat group it refers to as APT28. APT28 focuses on collecting intelligence that would be most useful to a government. FireEye found that since at least 2007, APT28 has been targeting privileged information related to governments, militaries, and security organizations that would likely benefit the Russian government.

2015
In 2015, FireEye confirmed the existence of at least 14 router implants spread across four different countries: Ukraine, the Philippines, Mexico, and India. Referred to as SYNful Knock, the implant is a stealthy modification of the router’s firmware image that can be used to maintain persistence within a victim’s network.

In September 2015, FireEye obtained an injunction against a security researcher attempting to report vulnerabilities in FireEye Malware Protection System.

In 2015, FireEye uncovered an attack exploiting two previously unknown vulnerabilities, one in Microsoft Office and another in Windows. The attackers hid the exploit within a Microsoft Word document (.docx) that appeared to be a résumé. The combination of these two exploits grants fully privileged remote code execution. Both vulnerabilities were patched by Microsoft.

In 2015, the FireEye as a Service team in Singapore uncovered a phishing campaign exploiting an Adobe Flash Player zero-day vulnerability. Adobe released a patch for the vulnerability with an out-of-band security bulletin. FireEye attributed the activity to a China-based threat group it tracks as APT3.

2016
In 2016, FireEye announced that it has been tracking a pair of cybercriminals referred to as the “Vendetta Brothers.” The company said that the enterprising duo uses various strategies to compromise point-of-sale systems, steal payment card information and sell it on their underground marketplace “Vendetta World.”
In mid-2016, FireEye released a report on the impact of the 2015 agreement between former U.S. President Barack Obama and China's paramount leader Xi Jinping that neither government would “conduct or knowingly support cyber-enabled theft of intellectual property” for economic advantage. The security firm reviewed the activity of 72 groups that it suspects are operating in China or otherwise support Chinese state interests and determined that, as of mid-2014, there was an overall decrease in successful network compromises by China-based groups against organizations in the U.S. and 25 other countries.

In 2016, FireEye announced that it had identified several versions of an ICS-focused malware – dubbed IRON GATE – crafted to manipulate a specific industrial process running within a simulated Siemens control system environment. Although Siemens Product Computer Emergency Readiness Team (ProductCERT) confirmed to FireEye that IRON GATE is not viable against operational Siemens control systems and that IRON GATE does not exploit any vulnerabilities in Siemens products, the security firm said that IRON GATE invokes ICS attack concepts first seen in Stuxnet.

On May 8, 2016, FireEye detected an attack exploiting a previously unknown vulnerability in Adobe Flash Player. The security firm reported the issue to the Adobe Product Security Incident Response Team (PSIRT) and Adobe released a patch for the vulnerability just four days later.

In 2016, FireEye discovered a widespread vulnerability affecting Android devices that permits local privilege escalation to the built-in user “radio”, making it so an attacker can potentially perform activities such as viewing the victim’s SMS database and phone history. FireEye reached out to Qualcomm in January 2016 and subsequently worked with the Qualcomm Product Security Team to address the issue.

In 2016, FireEye provided details on FIN6, a cybercriminal group that steals payment card data for monetization from targets predominately in the hospitality and retail sectors. The group was observed aggressively targeting and compromising point-of-sale (POS) systems, and making off millions of payment card numbers that were later sold on an underground marketplace.

2017–2019
In 2017, FireEye detected malicious Microsoft Office RTF documents leveraging a previously undisclosed vulnerability, . This vulnerability allows a malicious actor to download and execute a Visual Basic script containing PowerShell commands when a user opens a document containing an embedded exploit. FireEye shared the details of the vulnerability with Microsoft and coordinated public disclosure timed with the release of a patch by Microsoft to address the vulnerability.

In 2018, FireEye helped Facebook identify 652 fake accounts.

2020–2021
FireEye revealed on Tuesday, December 8, 2020, that its systems were pierced by what it called "a nation with top-tier offensive capabilities". The company said the attackers used "novel techniques" to steal copies of FireEye's red team tool kit, which the attackers could potentially use in other attacks. The same day, FireEye published countermeasures against the tools that had been stolen.

A week later in December 2020, FireEye reported the SolarWinds supply chain attack to the U.S. National Security Agency (NSA), the federal agency responsible for defending the U.S. from cyberattacks, and said its tools were stolen by the same actors. The NSA is not known to have been aware of the attack before being notified by FireEye. The NSA uses SolarWinds software itself.

Within a week of FireEye's breach, cyber-security firm McAfee said the stolen tools had been used in at least 19 countries, including the US, the UK, Ireland, the Netherlands, and Australia.

During the continued investigation of the hack of their data and that of federal agencies revealed on December 8, 2020, FireEye reported in early January that the hacks originated from inside the USA, sometimes very close to the facilities affected, which enabled the hackers to evade surveillance by the National Security Agency and the defenses used by the Department of Homeland Security.

2022
A 2022 report by Trellix noted that hacking groups Wicked Panda (linked to China) and Cozy Bear (linked to Russia) were behind 46% of all state-sponsored hacking campaigns in the third quarter of 2021 and that in a third of all state-sponsored cyber attacks, the hackers abused Cobalt Strike security tools to get access to the victim's network. In a January 2022 report on Fox News, Trellix CEO Bryan Palma stated that there is an increasing level of cyberwarfare threats from Russia and China.

A 2022 Trellix report stated that hackers are using Microsoft OneDrive in an espionage campaign against government officials in Western Asia. The malware, named by Trellix as Graphite, employs Microsoft Graph to use OneDrive as a command and control server and execute the malware. The attack is split into multiple stages to remain hidden for as long as possible.

Acquisitions

References

External links
 
 

Computer security companies specializing in botnets
Technology companies of the United States
Companies based in Milpitas, California
Computer forensics
Companies listed on the Nasdaq
American companies established in 2004
2013 initial public offerings